Fernando Ghia (July 22, 1935 - June 1, 2005 in Rome) was an Italian film producer and talent agent. He was best known for producing films such as The Mission (1986), Lady Caroline Lamb (1973), and the television miniseries Nostromo (1997), based on Joseph Conrad's novel.

Ghia appeared as an actor in the 1958 film La Gerusalemme liberata. He had a stint working as an agent for the William Morris Agency, and was taught to speak English by Albert Finney. In 1972 he read an article about the Jesuit order and political trouble in South America in Time magazine which generated a lifelong interest in it and formed the basis of several of the films he produced, including The Mission and the Italian series Nostromo. He spent over a decade in Hollywood, returning to his native Italy in the late 1980s and establishing Pixit Productions in Rome. In the 1990s Ghia married actress Gaia De Laurentiis, 35 years his junior; they had a son, Sebastian, in 1996. At his funeral in June 2005, Ennio Morricone's stirring theme for The Mission was reportedly played.

References

External links

PBS interview with Ghia on Nostromo

Italian film producers
Italian talent agents
1935 births
2005 deaths
Film people from Rome